(1926-1978) was a Japanese film director. He joined Shochiku film company as an assistant director in 1949.  In 1954, he moved to Nikkatsu film company and made his director debut with the film Kurutta kajitsu in 1956. Born in 1926 in Tokyo, Nakahira directed 34 films between 1956 and 1975.  His 1971 film Yami no naka no chimimoryo (A Soul to Devil) was nominated for the Palme d'Or at the Cannes Film Festival.

Filmography as assistant director 
 Ojōsan shachō, lit. "Madame Company President" (1953)

Filmography 
List of films as director.
 Kurutta kajitsu (1956)
 Gyūnyū-ya furanki (1956)
 Bitoku no yoromeki (1957)
 Kurenai no tsubasa (1958)
 Sono kabe o kudake (1959)
 Aitsu to watashi (1961)
 Arabu no arashi (1961)
 On the Banks of the Nile (Ala defat el Nil) (1963)
 Dorodarake no junjō (1963)
 Hikaru umi (1963)
 Onna no uzu to fuchi to nagare (1964)
 Getsuyōbi no Yuka (1964)
 Suna no ue no shokubutsu-gun (1964)
 Ryojin nikki (1964)
 Yarō ni kokkyô wa nai (1965)
 Akai gurasu (1966)
 1967 Te jing 009
The spiders no daishin-geki (1968)
 1968 Summer Heat 
 1969 Lie ren 
 1971 Yami no naka no chimimoryo

Personal life 
Nakahira was originally named Koh Nakahira. 
Nakahira's Chinese name was Yeung Shu-Hei (楊樹希). On September 11, 1978, Nakahira died.

References

External links 
 https://www.imdb.com/name/nm0620008/

1926 births
1978 deaths
Japanese film directors